Valencian or Valencian language is the official, historical and traditional name used in the Valencian Community (Spain), and unofficially in the El Carche comarca in Murcia (Spain), to refer to the Romance language also known as Catalan. The Valencian Community's 1982 Statute of Autonomy and the Spanish Constitution officially recognise Valencian as the regional language.

As a glottonym, it is used for referring either to the language as a whole or to the Valencian specific linguistic forms. Valencian displays transitional features between Ibero-Romance languages and Gallo-Romance languages. Its similarity with Occitan has led many scholars to group it under the Occitano-Romance languages.

There is a political controversy within the Valencian Community regarding its status as a glottonym or as a language on its own, since official reports show that slightly more than half of the people in the Valencian Community consider it as a separate language, different from Catalan, although the same studies show that this percentage decreases dramatically among younger generations and people with higher studies. Due to not having been officially recognised for a long time, the number of speakers has severely decreased, and the influence of Spanish has led to the adoption of a huge number of loanwords.

Some of the most important works of Valencian literature experienced a golden age during the Late Middle Ages and the Renaissance. Important works include Joanot Martorell's chivalric romance , and Ausiàs March's poetry. The first book produced with movable type in the Iberian Peninsula was printed in the Valencian variety. The earliest recorded chess game with modern rules for moves of the queen and bishop was in the Valencian poem  (1475).

Official status
The official status of Valencian is regulated by the Spanish Constitution and the Valencian Statute of Autonomy, together with the Law of Use and Education of Valencian (ca).

Article 6 of the Valencian Statute of Autonomy sets the legal status of Valencian, providing that:
The native language of the Valencian Community is Valencian.
Valencian is official within the Valencian Community, along with Spanish, which is the official language nationwide. Everyone shall have the right to know it and use it, and receive education in Valencian.
No one can be discriminated against by reason of their language.
Special protection and respect shall be given to the recuperation of Valencian.
The Acadèmia Valenciana de la Llengua shall be the normative institution of the Valencian language.

The Law of Use and Education of Valencian develops this framework, providing for implementation of a bilingual educational system, and regulating the use of Valencian in the public administration and judiciary system, where citizens can freely use it when acting before both.

Valencian is recognised under the European Charter for Regional or Minority Languages as "Valencian".

Distribution and usage

Distribution 

Valencian is not spoken all over the Valencian Community. Roughly a quarter of its territory, equivalent to 10% of the population (its inland part and areas in the extreme south as well), is traditionally Spanish-speaking only, whereas Valencian is spoken to varying degrees elsewhere.

Additionally, it is also spoken by a reduced number of people in El Carche, a rural area in the Region of Murcia adjoining the Valencian Community; nevertheless Valencian does not have any official recognition in this area. Although the Valencian language was an important part of the history of this zone, nowadays only about 600 people are able to speak Valencian in the area of El Carche.

Knowledge and usage 

In 2010 the Generalitat Valenciana published a study, Knowledge and Social use of Valencian, which included a survey sampling more than 6,600 people in the provinces of Castellon, Valencia, and Alicante.  The survey simply collected the answers of respondents and did not include any testing or verification.  The results were:

Valencian was the language "always, generally, or most commonly used":
 at home: 31.6%
 with friends: 28.0%
 in internal business relations: 24.7%

For ability:
 48.5% answered they speak Valencian "perfectly" or "quite well" (54.3% in the Valencian-speaking areas and 10% in the Spanish-speaking areas)
 26.2% answered they write Valencian "perfectly" or "quite well" (29.5% in the Valencian-speaking areas and 5.8% in the Spanish-speaking areas)

The survey shows that, although Valencian is still the common language in many areas in the Valencian Community, where slightly more than half of the Valencian population are able to speak it, most Valencians do not usually speak in Valencian in their social relations.

Moreover, according to a survey in 2008, there is a downward trend in everyday Valencian users. The lowest numbers are in the major cities of Valencia and Alicante, where the percentage of everyday speakers is in single figures. All in all, in the 1993–2006 period, the number of speakers fell by 10 per cent. One of the factors cited is the increase in the numbers of immigrants from other countries, who tend to favour using Spanish over local languages; accordingly, the number of residents who claim no understanding of Valencian sharply increased. One curiosity in the heartlands mentioned above, is that most of the children of immigrants go to public school and are therefore taught in Valencian and are far more comfortable speaking this with their friends. However, some children of Valencian speakers go to private schools run by the Church where the curriculum is in Spanish and consequently this becomes their preferred language.

Features of Valencian 

Note that this is a list of features of the main forms of Valencian as a group of dialectal varieties that differ from those of other Catalan dialects, particularly from the Central variety of the language. For more general information on the features of Valencian, see Catalan language. There is a great deal of variety within the Valencian Community, and by no means do the features below apply to every local version.

Phonology

Vowels 

This effect is more pronounced in unstressed syllables, where the phones are best transcribed . As the process is completely predictable, the latter symbols are not used elsewhere in the article.
This feature is also found in Balearic.
  is slightly more open and centralised before liquids  and in monosyllabics.
  is most often a back vowel. In some dialects (including Balearic)  can be unrounded.
 The vowel  is slightly more fronted and closed than in Central Catalan (but less fronted and closed than in Majorcan). The precise phonetic realisation of the vowel  in Valencian is [ ~ ], this vowel is subject to assimilation in many instances.
This is not transcribed in the article.
 Final unstressed  may have the following values: [ ~  ~ ], depending on the preceding sounds and/or dialect, e.g. taula  'table'.
 All vowels are phonetically nasalised between nasal consonants or when preceding a syllable-final nasal.
 Vowels can be lengthened in some contexts.
 There are five general unstressed vowels . Although unstressed vowels are more stable than in Eastern Catalan dialects, there are many cases where they merge:
In the Standard all these reductions are accepted ( →  is only accepted in words with the suffix -ixement).
 Many Valencian dialects, especially Southern Valencian, feature some sort of vowel harmony (harmonia vocàlica). This process is normally progressive (i.e. preceding vowels affect those pronounced afterwards) over the last unstressed vowel of a word; e.g. hora  >  'hour'. However, there are cases where regressive metaphony occurs over pretonic vowels; e.g. tovallola  >  'towel', afecta  >  'affects'.
 In a wider sense, vowel harmony can occur in further instances, due to different processes involving palatalisation, velarisarion and labialisation
In certain cases, the unstressed  become silent when followed or preceded by a stressed vowel: quinze anys .
In certain accents, vowels occurring at the end of a prosodic unit may be realized as centering diphthongs for special emphasis, so that Eh tu! Vine ací "Hey you! Come here!" may be pronounced . The non-syllabic  is unrelated to this phenomenon as it is an unstressed non-syllabic allophone of  that occurs after vowels, much like in Spanish.

Consonants 

 The voiced stops  are lenited to approximants  after a continuant, i.e. a vowel or any type of consonant other than a stop or nasal (exceptions include  after lateral consonants). These sounds are realised as voiceless plosives in the coda in standard Valencian.
  can also be lenited in betacist dialects.
  is often elided between vowels following a stressed syllable (found notably in feminine participles,  → , and in the suffix -dor); e.g. fideuà  ( < fideuada) ' fideuà', mocador  'tissue' (note this feature, although widely spread in South Valencia, is not recommended in standard Valencian, except for reborrowed terms such as Albà, Roà, the previously mentioned fideuà, etc.).
 Unlike other Catalan dialects, the clusters  and  never geminate or fortify in intervocalic position (e.g. poble  'village').
The velar stops ,  are fronted to pre-velar position [, ] before front vowels: qui  ('who').
 Valencian has preserved in most of its varieties the mediaeval voiced pre-palatal affricate  (similar to the j in English "jeep") in contexts where other modern dialects have developed fricative consonants  (like the si in English "vision"), e.g. dijous  ('Thursday').
 Note the fricative  appears only as a voiced allophone of  before vowels and voiced consonants; e.g. peix al forn  'oven fish'.
 Unlike other Catalan dialects,  and  do not geminate (in most accents): metge  ('medic'), and cotxe  ('car'). Exceptions may include learned terms like pidgin  ('pidgin').
  occurs in Balearic, Alguerese, standard Valencian and some areas in southern Catalonia (e.g. viu , 's/he lives'). It has merged with  elsewhere.
  is realized as an approximant  after continuants: avanç  ('advance'). This is not transcribed in this article.
Also in words like botzina  ('horn'), horitzó  ('horizon') and magatzem  ('storehouse') (c.f. guitza , 'bother').
 Most varieties of Valencian preserve final stops in clusters (e.g. , and ): camp  'field' (a feature shared with modern Balearic). Dialectally, all final clusters can be simplified.
  is normally velarised, especially in the coda.
  is generally dropped in the word altre  ('other'), as well as in derived terms.
  is mostly retained in the coda (e.g. estar , 'to be'), except for some cases where it is dropped: arbre  ('tree") and diners  ('money'). In some dialects  can be further dropped in combinatory forms with infinitives and pronouns.
 In some dialects,  is pronounced  or  after . In the Standard only is accepted after  (in the inchoative form with  → ), and after : ells  ('they'). In some variants the result may be an affricate.

Morphology 
 The present first-person singular of verbs differs from Central Catalan.  All those forms without final -o are more akin to mediaeval Catalan and contemporary Balearic Catalan.

 An exclusive feature of Valencian is the subjunctive imperfect morpheme -ra:  ('that he might come').
 Valencian has -i- as theme vowel for inchoative verbs of the third conjugation; e.g.  ('s/he serves'), like North-Western Catalan. Although, again, this cannot be generalised since there are Valencian dialects that utilize -ei-, e.g. .
 In Valencian the simple past tense (e.g.  'he sang') is more frequently used in speech than in Central Catalan, where the periphrastic past (e.g.  'he sang') is prevailing and the simple past mostly appears in written language. The same, however, may be said of the Balearic dialects.
 The infinitive  ('to see') has the variant , which belongs to more informal and spontaneous registers.
 The usage of the periphrasis of obligation  +  + infinitive is widely spread in colloquial Valencian, instead of the Standard  +  (equivalent to English "have to").

Clitics
 In general, use of modern forms of the determinate article (el, els 'the') and the third-person unstressed object pronouns (el, els 'him, them'), though some dialects (for instance the one spoken in Vinaròs area) preserve etymological forms lo, los as in Lleida. For the other unstressed object pronouns, etymological old forms (me, te, se, ne, mos, vos...) can be found, depending on places, in conjunction with the more modern reinforced ones (em, et, es, en, ens, us...).
 The adverbial pronoun hi ('there') is almost never used in speech and is replaced by other pronouns. The adverbial pronoun en ('him/her/them/it') is used less than in Catalonia and the Balearic Islands.
 Combined weak clitics with li ('him/her/it') preserve the li, whereas in Central Catalan it is replaced by hi. For example, the combination li + el gives li'l in Valencian (l'hi in Central Catalan).
 The weak pronoun ho ('it') is pronounced as:
 , when it forms syllable with a pronoun:  ,   ('s/he gives it to me')
 , when precedes a vowel or when coming after a vowel:   ('s/he gives it to her/him'),   ('you give it')
 , when it comes after a consonant or a semivowel:   ('to give it').
Similar pronunciations can be heard in North-Western Catalan and Ibizan.
 The preposition amb ('with') merges with en ('in') in most Valencian dialects.

 Vocabulary 
Valencian vocabulary contains words both restricted to the Valencian-speaking domain, as well as words shared with other Catalan varieties, especially with Northwestern ones. Words are rarely spread evenly over the Valencian community, but are usually contained to parts of it, or spread out into other dialectal areas. Examples include hui 'today' (found in all of Valencia except transitional dialects, in Northern dialects avui) and espill 'mirror' (shared with Northwestern dialects, Central Catalan mirall). There is also variation within Valencia, such as 'corn', which is dacsa in Central and Southern Valencian, but panís in Alicante and Northern Valencian (as well as in Northwestern Catalan). Since Standard Valencian is based on the Southern dialect, words from this dialect are often used as primary forms in the standard language, despite other words traditionally being used in other Valencian dialects. Examples of this are tomaca 'tomato' (which is tomata outside of Southern Valencian) and matalaf 'mattress' (which is matalap in most of Valencia, including parts of the Southern Valencian area).

Below are a selection of words which differ or have different forms in Standard Valencian and Catalan. In many cases, both standards include this variation in their respective dictionaries, but differ as to what form is considered primary. In other cases, Valencian includes colloquial forms not present in the IEC standard. Primary forms in each standard are shown in bold (and may be more than one form). Words in brackets are present in the standard in question, but differ in meaning from how the cognate is used in the other standard.

{| class="wikitable"
|-
! Standard Valencian (AVL) !! Standard Catalan (IEC) !! English
|-
| així, aixina || així || like this
|-
| bresquilla, préssec || préssec, bresquilla || peach
|-
| creïlla, patata || patata, creïlla || potato
|-
| dènou, dèneu, dinou|| dinou, dènou || nineteen
|-
| dos, dues || dues, dos || two (f.)
|-
| eixe, aqueix || aqueix, eixe || that
|-
| eixir, sortir || sortir, eixir || to exit, leave
|-
| engrunsadora, gronxador(a) || gronxador(a) || swing
|-
| espill, mirall || mirall, espill || mirror
|-
| este, aquest || aquest, este || this
|-
| estel, estrela, estrella || estel, estrella, estrela || star
|-
| hòmens, homes || homes || men (plural)
|-
| hui, avui || avui, hui || today
|-
| huit, vuit || vuit, huit || eight
|-
| lluny, llunt || lluny || far
|-
| meló d'Alger, meló d'aigua, síndria || síndria, meló d'aigua, meló d'Alger || watermelon
|-
| meua, meva teua, teva seua, seva || meva, meua teva, teua seva, seua || my, mine your(s) his/her(s)/its
|-
| mitat, meitat || meitat, mitat || half
|-
| palometa, papallona || papallona, palometa || butterfly
|-
| per favor || si us plau, per favor || please
|-
| periodista, periodiste (-a) || periodista || journalist
|-
| polp, pop || pop, polp || octopus
|-
| quint, cinqué || cinquè, quint || fifth
|-
| rabosa, guineu || guineu, rabosa || fox
|-
| roí(n), dolent || dolent, roí || bad, evil
|-
| roig, vermell || vermell, roig || red
|-
| sext, sisé || sisè, sext || sixth
|-
| tindre, tenir || tenir, tindre || to have
|-
| tomaca, tomàquet, tomata || tomàquet, tomaca, tomata || tomato
|-
| vacacions, vacances ||vacances, vacacions || holidays
|-
|veure, vore ||veure|| to see
|-
|vindre, venir ||venir, vindre || to come
|-
|xicotet, petit ||petit, xicotet ||small
|}

 Varieties of Valencian 

 Standard Valencian 

The Academy of Valencian Studies (Acadèmia Valenciana de la Llengua, AVL), established by law in 1998 by the Valencian autonomous government and constituted in 2001, is in charge of dictating the official rules governing the use of Valencian. Currently, the majority of people who write in Valencian use this standard.

Standard Valencian is based on the standard of the Institute of Catalan Studies (Institut d'Estudis Catalans, IEC), used in Catalonia, with a few adaptations. This standard roughly follows the Rules of Castelló (Normes de Castelló) from 1932, a set of othographic guidelines regarded as a compromise between the essence and style of Pompeu Fabra's guidelines, but also allowing the use of Valencian idiosyncrasies.

 Valencian dialects 

 Transitional Valencian (valencià de transició) or Tortosan (tortosí): spoken only in the northernmost areas of the province of Castellon in towns like Benicarló or Vinaròs, the area of Matarranya in Aragon (province of Teruel), and a southern border area of Catalonia surrounding Tortosa, in the province of Tarragona.
 Word-initial and postconsonantal  (Catalan  and ) alternates with  intervocalically; e.g. joc  ('game'), but pitjor  ('worse'), boja  ('crazy') (Standard Valencian , ; ; Standard Catalan ,  and ).
 Final   is not pronounced in infinitives; e.g. cantar  (Standard ) ('to sing').
 Archaic articles lo, los ('the') are used instead of el, els; e.g. lo xic ('the boy'), los hòmens ('the men').
 Northern Valencian (valencià septentrional) or Castellon's Valencian (valencià castellonenc): spoken in an area surrounding the city of Castellón de la Plana.
 Use of  sound instead of standard   in the third person singular of most verbs; e.g. (ell) cantava  (Standard ) 'he sang'. Thus, Northern Valencian dialects contrast forms like (jo) cantava  ('I sang') with (ell) cantava  ('he sang'), but merges (jo) cante  ('I sing') with (ell) canta  ('he sings').
 Palatalization of    >  and   > ; e.g. pots  >  ('cans, jars, you can'), dotze  >  ('twelve').
 Central Valencian (valencià central), or Apitxat, spoken in Valencia city and its area, but not used as standard by the Valencian media.
 Betacism, that is the merge of  into ; e.g. viu  (instead of ) ('he lives').
 Fortition (gemination) and vocalisation of final consonants; nit  (instead of ) ('night').
 It preserves the strong simple past, which has been substituted by an analytic past (periphrastic past) with  + infinitive in the rest of modern Catalan and Valencian variants. For example, aní instead of vaig anar ('I went').
 Southern Valencian (valencià meridional): spoken in the contiguous comarques located in the southernmost part of the Valencia province and the northernmost part in the province of Alicante. This dialect is considered as Standard Valencian.
 Vowel harmony: the final syllable of a disyllabic word adopts a preceding open  or  if the final vowel is an unstressed  - or -; e.g. terra  ('earth, land'), dona  ('woman').
 This dialect retain geminate consonants (  and  ); e.g. guatla  ('quail'), cotna  ('rind').
 Weak pronouns are "reinforced" in front of the verb (em, en, et, es, etc.) contrary to other dialects which maintains "full form" (me, ne, te, se, etc.).
 Alicante's Valencian (valencià alacantí): spoken in the southern half of the province of Alicante, and the area of El Carche in Murcia.
 Intervocalic  elision in most instances; e.g. roda  ('wheel'), nadal  ('Christmas').
 Final  is not pronounced in infinitives; e.g. cantar  ('to sing').
 There are some archaisms like: ans instead of abans ('before'), manco instead of menys ('less'), dintre instead of dins ('into') or devers instead of cap a ('towards').
 There are more interferences with Spanish than other dialects: assul (from azul) instead of blau (or atzur) ('blue'), llimpiar (from limpiar) instead of netejar ('to clean') or sacar (from sacar) instead of traure ('take out').

 Authors and literature 

 Middle Ages 
 Misteri d'Elx (c. 1350). Liturgical drama. Listed as Masterpiece of the Oral and Intangible Heritage of Humanity by UNESCO.

 Renaissance 
 Ausiàs March (Gandia, 1400 – Valencia, 3 March 1459). Poet, widely read in renaissance Europe.
 Joanot Martorell (Gandia, 1413–1468). Knight and the author of the novel Tirant lo Blanch.
 Isabel de Villena (Valencia, 1430–1490).  Religious poet.
 Joan Roís de Corella (Gandia or Valencia, 1435 – Valencia, 1497). Knight and poet.
 Obres e trobes en lahors de la Verge Maria (1474) The first book printed in Spain. It is the compendium of a religious poetry contest held that year in the town of Valencia.

 Media in Valencian 

Until its dissolution in November 2013, the public-service Ràdio Televisió Valenciana (RTVV) was the main broadcaster of radio and television in Valencian language. The Generalitat Valenciana constituted it in 1984 in order to guarantee the freedom of information of the Valencian people in their own language. It was reopened again in 2018 in the same location but under a different name, À Punt, and it is owned by À Punt Media, a group owned by the Generalitat Valenciana. The new television channel claims to be plural, informative and neutral for all of the Valencian population. It is bilingual, with a focus on the Valencian language. It's recognised as a regional TV channel.

Prior to its dissolution, the administration of RTVV under the People's Party (PP) had been controversial due to accusations of ideological manipulation and lack of plurality. The news broadcast was accused of giving marginal coverage of the Valencia Metro derailment in 2006 and the indictment of President de la Generalitat Francisco Camps in the Gürtel scandal in 2009. Supervisors appointed by the PP were accused of sexual harassment.

In face of an increasing debt due to excessive expenditure by the PP, RTVV announced in 2012 a plan to shed 70% of its labour. The plan was nullified on 5 November 2013 by the National Court after trade unions appealed against it. On that same day, the President de la Generalitat Alberto Fabra (also from PP) announced RTVV would be closed, claiming that reinstating the employees was untenable. On 27 November, the legislative assembly passed the dissolution of RTVV and employees organised to take control of the broadcast, starting a campaign against the PP. Nou TV's last broadcast ended abruptly when Spanish police pulled the plug at 12:19 on 29 November 2013.

Having lost all revenues from advertisements and facing high costs from the termination of hundreds of contracts, critics question whether the closure of RTVV has improved the financial situation of the Generalitat, and point out to plans to benefit private-owned media. Currently, the availability of media in the Valencian language is extremely limited. All the other autonomous communities in Spain, including the monolingual ones, have public-service broadcasters, with the Valencian Community being the only exception despite being the fourth most populated.

In July 2016 a new public corporation, Valencian Media Corporation, was launched in substitution of RTVV. It manages and controls several public media in the Valencian Community, including the television channel À Punt, which started broadcasting in June 2018.

 Politico-linguistic controversy 

Linguists, including Valencian scholars, deal with Catalan and Valencian as the same language. The official regulating body of the language of the Valencian community, the Valencian Language Academy (Acadèmia Valenciana de la Llengua, AVL) considers Valencian and Catalan to be two names for the same language.

The AVL was established in 1998 by the PP-UV government of Eduardo Zaplana. According to El País, Jordi Pujol, then president of Catalonia and of the CiU, negotiated with Zaplana in 1996 to ensure the linguistic unity of Catalan in exchange for CiU support of the appointment of José María Aznar as Prime Minister of Spain. Zaplana has denied this, claiming that "[n]ever, never, was I able to negotiate that which is not negotiable, neither that which is not in the negotiating scope of a politician. That is, the unity of the language". The AVL orthography is based on the Normes de Castelló, a set of rules for writing Valencian established in 1932. 

A rival set of rules, called Normes del Puig, were established in 1979 by the Royal Academy of Valencian Culture (Real Acadèmia de Cultura Valenciana, RACV), which considers itself a rival language academy to the AVL, and promotes an alternative orthography, treating Valencian as an independent language, as opposed to a variety of Catalan. Compared to Standard Valencian, this orthography excludes many words not traditionally used in the Valencian Community, and also prefers spellings such as ⟨ch⟩ for /tʃ/ and ⟨y⟩ for /j/ (as in Spanish).
 
Valencian is classified as a Western dialect, along with the North-Western varieties spoken in Western Catalonia (Province of Lleida and most of the Province of Tarragona). The various forms of Catalan and Valencian are mutually intelligible (ranging from 90% to 95%)

Despite the position of the official organizations, an opinion poll carried out between 2001 and 2004 showed that the majority (65%) of the Valencian people (both Valencian and Spanish speakers) consider Valencian different from Catalan: this position is promoted by people who do not use Valencian regularly. Furthermore, the data indicate that younger people educated in Valencian are much less likely to hold these views. According to an official poll in 2014, 52% of Valencians considered Valencian to be a language different from Catalan, while 41% considered the languages to be the same. This poll showed significant differences regarding age and level of education, with a majority of those aged 18–24 (51%) and those with a higher education (58%) considering Valencian to be the same language as Catalan. This can be compared to those aged 65 and above (29%) and those with only primary education (32%), where the same view has its lowest support.

The ambiguity regarding the term Valencian and its relation to Catalan has sometimes led to confusion and controversy. In 2004, during the drafting of the European Constitution, the regional governments of Spain where a language other than Spanish is co-official were asked to submit translations into the relevant language in question. Since different names are used in Catalonia ("Catalan") and in the Valencian Community ("Valencian"), the two regions each provided one version, which were identical to each other.

 See also 
 Pluricentric language
 Valencian Sign Language
  (spelled xe in Modern Valencian)
 Similar linguistic controversies:
Andalusian language movement
Names given to the Spanish language
Moldovan language
Occitan language
Serbo-Croatian

Notes

References

Bibliography
 
 Colomina i Castanyer, Jordi, (1995). Els valencians i la llengua normativa. Textos universitaris. Alicante: Institut de Cultura "Juan Gil-Albert". .
 
 Guinot, Enric (1999). Els fundadors del Regne de València. Edicions 3i4, Valencia 1999. 
 
 Salvador i Gimeno, Carles (1951). Gramàtica valenciana. Associació Cultural Lo Rat Penat. Valencia 1995. .
 
 
 
 Salvador i Gimeno, Carles (1963). Valencians i la llengua autòctona durant els segles XVI, XVII i XVIII. Institució Alfons el Magnànim. Valencia. .
 Sanchis i Guarner, Manuel (1934, 1967). La llengua dels valencians. Edicions 3i4, Valencia 2005.  .
 Valor i Vives, Enric (1973). Curs mitjà de gramàtica catalana, referida especialment al País Valencià''. Grog Editions, Valencia 1999.  .

External links 

 Acadèmia Valenciana de la Llengua
 Valencian dictionary
 Institut Joan Lluís Vives
 Documents
 Disputing theories about Valencian origin 
 The origins and evolution of language secessionism in Valencia. An analysis from the transition period until today
 Article from El País (25 October 2005) regarding report on use of Valencian published by Servei d'Investicació i Estudis Sociolinguístics